The Downpatrick and County Down Railway (DCDR) is a 5 foot, 3 inch (1,600 mm) gauge heritage railway in County Down, Northern Ireland. It is operated by volunteers and runs passenger trains using steam and diesel locomotives, diesel railcars, and vintage carriages. The railway has approximately three miles (4.8 km) of track in a triangular-shaped layout, which connects the town of Downpatrick with the historical sites of Inch Abbey to the north and King Magnus’ Grave to the south. It also houses a museum of railway artefacts and rolling stock originating from both Northern Ireland and the Republic of Ireland, dating from the 1860s to the 1980s.

The DCDR’s development was spearheaded by a group of local railway enthusiasts in the early 1980s, and work started on building the railway in 1985. Most of its track is on part of the now-closed Belfast and County Down Railway (BCDR) mainline which ran between Belfast, Downpatrick, and Newcastle. The heritage railway first opened to the public in December 1987, and originally consisted of little more than a short stretch of track with an E-class diesel locomotive and a brake van. It has expanded incrementally since then, and reached its current length with the completion of the Inch Abbey line in 2005.

The DCDR is the only five-foot, three-inch gauge heritage railway in Ireland, which has been the standard gauge on the island since the 1840s. With its Downpatrick terminus located at the foot of Down Cathedral and next to the Saint Patrick Centre, the railway has become a major tourist attraction for the town and has accumulated several hundred members. It currently has three steam and eight diesel locomotives, five of which are on loan from the Irish Traction Group, as well as the largest collection of Victorian railway carriages in Ireland. Some of these have been overhauled by the railway’s volunteers from a dilapidated state, and have received awards for their restoration.

History

Belfast and County Down Railway 
The first railway in Downpatrick was opened to the public in March 1859, with the completion of the Belfast and County Down Railway mainline from Belfast Queen's Quay. Downpatrick's railway facilities included a substantial station building on Market Street, a two-road train shed, a goods store, an engine shed, and a turntable. The line was constructed under the management of the BCDR's chief engineer Sir John Macneill, and included a bridge over the marshy estuary of the River Quoile, just outside Downpatrick. The original bridge consisted of lattice trusses supported by timber piles driven into the riverbed, and was replaced with a steel girder bridge in 1929. As it was built on the floodplain of the River Quoile, the line towards Downpatrick often suffered from flooding, particularly during the winter months.

The railway originally terminated at Downpatrick, but in 1869 a separate company, the Downpatrick, Dundrum and Newcastle Railway, built an extension from Downpatrick to the seaside town of Newcastle. The Newcastle line was operated by the BCDR and purchased by them in 1881. The extension created an inconvenience wherein a train running between Belfast and Newcastle had to stop in Downpatrick and uncouple its locomotive, which moved via a run-round loop to the other end of the train in order to continue its journey. This significantly increased journey times and caused excessive congestion at the Downpatrick terminus.

The opportunity arose in 1892 to end this cumbersome practice with the opening of the Downpatrick, Killough and Ardglass Railway and, with it, Downpatrick Loop Platform. The Ardglass line was built and operated by the BCDR, and branched off from their mainline about a kilometre south of Downpatrick station. In conjunction with this, a loop line was constructed to directly link the Newcastle and Belfast lines, with the Loop Platform located at the South Junction. This enabled Newcastle-bound trains from Belfast (and vice versa) to bypass the main Downpatrick station, and instead call at the Loop Platform where passengers intending for Downpatrick or Ardglass could board a local train. Meanwhile, the mainline train could carry on without having to run around. This resulted in an unusual triangular-shaped layout, the trackbed of which forms the basis of most of the DCDR's operational railway line.

Decline and closure of the Belfast – Newcastle Line 
Following the 1945 Ballymacarrett rail crash and the resultant £80,000 (the equivalent of over £3,530,000 in 2020) it had to pay in compensation, the BCDR was financially ruined. This was a deciding factor in the nationalisation of the company, which became part of the Ulster Transport Authority (UTA) in 1948. The UTA's railways were in need of significant investment following years of underfunding during World War II; as a result, Northern Ireland's devolved government established a tribunal to determine the future of its public transport system. In December 1949 the tribunal authorised the closure of all ex-BCDR lines except the Bangor branch, as part of an effort to avoid excess expenditure on railway maintenance and to divert assets towards improving the UTA's road services.

The entire Belfast – Newcastle line south of Comber, including Downpatrick, was closed on Sunday 15 January 1950. The track and almost all of the railway infrastructure was removed in 1953, and the station was used by the UTA's bus division, which became Ulsterbus in 1968. Most of the trackbed along the line was sold by the UTA to private individuals who owned adjoining land: the trackbed in the Downpatrick area was sold to Charles Mulholland, 3rd Baron Dunleath, and was left largely undisturbed until the arrival of the DCDR. Although the 1929-built Quoile Bridge was dismantled for scrap, the Loop Platform and several smaller nearby bridges were left intact. The station building was demolished shortly after Ulsterbus moved to a new depot in the town in 1975, and part of the former station yard was used as a storage depot by the Department of the Environment's Road Service.

Heritage Railway 
Local architect Gerry Cochrane M.B.E. was inspired to start the scheme after taking a walk along the route of the line, and by 1982 had gained support to rebuild part of the line as a heritage steam railway from the local council. Lord Dunleath, whose father had purchased the railway trackbed adjacent to his estate after the closure of the BCDR in Downpatrick, gave the newly formed society a package of land on which to build the line and station for a peppercorn rent. This was on the approaches to the old Downpatrick station, which had been demolished in the 1970s. Work started on rebuilding the railway in 1985, with public trains finally running in the town again in Friday 4 December 1987, making it the first Irish gauge heritage railway in Ireland to carry passengers over its own track. Track has been relaid on nearly 6 km (4 mi) of Belfast and County Down Railway trackbed, and a 1.6 km (1 mi) extension south to the hamlet of Ballydugan is planned.

The railway began life as the Downpatrick & Ardglass Railway, as the original intention was to extend the railway to this fishing port on the south coast of County Down. This name was dropped in 1996 following the abandonment of this proposal and the railway was renamed the Downpatrick Railway Museum until 2005 when the new name, Downpatrick & County Down Railway was adopted following the opening of the Inch Abbey extension.

Between March 2020 and July 2022 (apart from a temporary resumption of service during Christmas 2021) the railway was closed to the public due to the COVID-19 pandemic. Volunteers continued work throughout the closure period, and normal service resumed on 16 July 2022

Operations

Approximately three miles (4.8 km) of  Irish standard gauge track are open , along which a steam locomotive, currently either O&K No. 1 or 3, and 1950s-60s era diesel locomotives are run, drawing preserved rolling stock. Passenger trains are usually operated with brake/generator standard class coach 3223, which was built in 1954 by Córas Iompair Éierann, brake/standard class coach 728, which was built in 1951 by the Ulster Transport Authority, and Park Royal brake/standard class coach 1944, also built in 1954 by Córas Iompair Éierann. Stock is added to or withdrawn from the 'running set' as maintenance allows. Older carriages built by the Great Southern and Western Railway and Belfast and County Down Railway were operated on the line, but as 1950s/1960s stock became available the DCDR moved these vintage carriages inside for overhaul and display. These vintage coaches are now used on a select few special running days, such as European Heritage Open Days and for private contracts, as they are too historically important for everyday wear and tear.

The railway also aims to have an at least partially operational mechanical signalling system, using the preserved King's Bog and Bundoran Junction signal cabins along with multiple semaphores that are on the site. Related to this is the Double Track Project, which will allow simultaneous operation on the North and South lines.

Every year, the DCDR operates the following trains:
 Saint Patrick's Day Specials, which are held on Saint Patrick's Day and operate to Inch Abbey.
 Easter Specials, which take place over a couple of days around the Easter Period, and operate to Inch Abbey.
 May Day Specials, which take place on May Day and operate to Inch Abbey.
 Summer Specials, which take place every weekend during summer and operate to Inch Abbey. Some of these days involve special events, as well as an annual diesel day. 
EHOD Days, which run in conjunction with the last Summer Specials weekend. These offer visitors free cab rides in a diesel as well as behind-the-scenes tours.
 Halloween Specials, which take place on the weekend prior to, and on, Halloween night, and operate to Magnus' Grave.
 Santa Specials, which take place on the weekend prior to Christmas, and operate to the Loop Platform.
 Mince Pie Specials, which take place on either the last or last weekend of the year, and operate to Magnus' Grave or Inch Abbey - these are usually diesel-hauled.

Bank Holidays, shunts, private charters and film contracts make for extra trains throughout the year too.

On operating days, visitors have access to the BCDR Museum which is housed upstairs in Downpatrick railway station, the Downpatrick East signal cabin, a model railway room, the workshop viewing area (Where carriages can be seen undergoing restoration) and the Carriage Gallery.

A gift shop and buffet carriage, the latter of which will be parked at Inch Abbey or Downpatrick Loop Platform railway station, are open on operating days.

Stations & Buildings

Stations 

 Downpatrick Station is the principal station on the DCDR network, where all passenger trains originate from. It has two platforms, though one of these is currently out of use. The original BCDR station was sited on Market Street, but was demolished and replaced by a supermarket before the DCDR was established.
 Downpatrick Loop Platform has no road access, which helped it to escape demolition in the 1950s. It serves as the interchange point between the DCDR's South and Loop lines. Downpatrick Loop has two platforms.
 King Magnus' Halt is the current terminus of the South Line. It has one platform and serves the grave of Viking King Magnus Barefoot, a site previously inaccessible before the arrival of the railway. Magnus Halt was not an original BCDR station, though it is located at the site of the BCDR's Ardglass Junction.
 Inch Abbey Halt is the current terminus of the North Line. It has two platforms and serves the ruins of Inch Abbey. The station was not part of the BCDR, as it is located on a short deviation away from the original trackbed.

Buildings & Structures 

Several of the railway's buildings, including its engine shed and two signal cabins, are original railway structures that were first erected in different parts Northern Ireland and later rebuilt brick-by-brick at Downpatrick.

 Downpatrick Station Building was originally the town's Gas Manager's House, sited across the road from the DCDR and moved over brick-by-brick.
 Downpatrick Signal Cabin, a BNCR structure, was moved brick-by-brick from Kingsbog Junction on the Belfast–Derry line. 
 Downpatrick East Signal Cabin, a GNR structure, was originally Bundoran Junction's North Cabin. It was moved to DCDR in 2011 and opened to the public in 2017.
 Downpatrick Locomotive Shed, a BNCR structure, was moved stone-by-stone from Maghera where it was originally the goods shed.
 Downpatrick Station Canopy was originally attached to the Maghera Shed.
 Downpatrick Water Tower was moved from Antrim station.
 The Arch, which spans the main gate, bears the name of the railway and is based on an original design at Cookstown.
 Bridges 163 & 164 are original BCDR bridges, and carry the Back and South lines respectively across a narrow stream.
 Downpatrick Loop Platform and Canopy are the only BCDR buildings left in Downpatrick. 
 The Cutting is just beyond the limit of passenger operations on the South Line. It carries trains up a slight gradient, with vertical retaining walls on either side.
 The Quoile Bridge is the longest bridge on the DCDR. It carries the North Line over the River Quoile, and though the spans are newly fabricated, the concrete centre pier is original.

Carriage Gallery 
Completed in 2012, the Carriage Gallery is the DCDR's museum with rolling stock that is not being used to run public trains during their visit. Like the Ulster Folk and Transport Museum, the Carriage Gallery houses vehicles in an indoors environment where the public can get up close and learn about both the vehicles in question, and Irish railways in general. Despite its name, the Carriage Gallery also contains locomotives, both steam and diesel, and even a road-going tar boiler. Designed in homage to the Victorian railway termini with their grand overall roofs, the Gallery collection is arranged across 3 roads with 4 platform faces, allowing visitors the chance to enter the vehicles. The condition of the exhibits ranges from fully restored to as-discovered so that visitors can appreciate the huge work required, with some carriages still in the hen-house state they were found in on farms across the country.

The Carriage Gallery was officially opened by the Earl Of Wessex in 2014.

Rolling Stock

Overview 
The railway hosts three steam locomotives, eight diesel locomotives, seven diesel railcar sets, twenty-four carriages, thirty-eight wagons and four permanent way vehicles, making for a total of eighty-three railway vehicles. If the railcar constituent coaches are considered as individual carriages, the total is ninety vehicles.

Engines 
At present O&K Nos. 1 and 3 are the operational steam locomotives. 1875-built 0-6-0 tank engine, GSWR No.90, delivered to Downpatrick on Sunday 30 September 2007, is Ireland's oldest steam engine capable of operation. Two E Class diesels, Nos. E421 and E432, were acquired in 1986, with E421 working the Society's first passenger trains. However, the E Class could not start from cold and thus three G Class diesels arrived at the railway to facilitate shunting and works trains - one was purchased privately by a volunteer from Westrail, and two are on long-term loan from the Irish Traction Group (ITG). The ITG also loans three mainline diesels to the railway - CIÉ A class No.A39R (arrived 22 November 2009), 141 class No. 146 (arrived 27 November 2010) and 201 Class No. C231. (arrived 7 June 2014).

Railcars 
Sligo, Leitrim and Northern Counties Railway Railcar B, built in 1947, was donated to the railway by Iarnród Éireann in 2006. This railcar arrived in poor condition and it will be some time before the DCDR can return it to operational condition. Prototype BR-Leyland railbus, RB3, which was modified in the early 1980s to run on Irish metals and was used for a period by Northern Ireland Railways, was acquired by DCDR in 2001, with the hope of using it to run midweek trains as it did not require as large a crew as locomotive-hauled trains. However, due to several faults inherent with the prototype Railbus' design, this did not come to fruition. Three more ex-NIR railcars are owned by DCDR, comprising the last 450 Class, 458 ''Antrim Castle'', which arrived in 2014 and has been converted to a buffet train, and two 80 class railcars which arrived in 2018.

Carriages 
There are four main 'carriage rakes'. These are:

 Old Buffet: Conventional 1950s carriages formerly used as the buffet train and Santa's Grotto during the Autumn and Winter months. Shown in pink on the tables below.
 New Buffet: A 450 Class railcar and DBSO used as the buffet train during the Spring and Summer months. Shown in blue on the tables below.
 Everyday Running Set: 1950s carriages used during most running days. Shown in green on the tables below.
 Vintage Running Set: Antique carriages (Edwardian period or earlier) normally on display in the Carriage Gallery, but brought into service for special events. Shown in brown on the table below.

The everyday running set currently consists of CIÉ 1944 and UTA 728, with generator van CIÉ 3223 being added for Autumn/Winter operations to provide heat and light. On special days, the Vintage Set is used, consisting of BCDR Nos. 72 and 148, and GSWR 836. 836 is also sometimes added to the everyday running set on very busy days, creating a high-capacity rake along with 1944 and 728 capable of seating over 200 people. The buffet set is publicly accessible on running days when it is parked in a platform (the New Buffet at Inch Abbey during Spring and Summer, and the Old Buffet at the Loop Platform in Autumn and Winter).

The remainder of the carriage fleet is considerably varied, with a mix of six- and four-wheeled and bogie carriages, and representatives from virtually every time period and Irish gauge railway company - including the BCDR (The DCDR owns 5 of the 6 extant BCDR carriages), GNR, GSWR, GSR, UTA, NIR, CIÉ, and most significantly, the Ulster Railway, which is represented by No. 33, the sole surviving UR vehicle and Ulster's oldest carriage. Other notable carriages are BCDR Railmotor No. 72 and Royal Saloon No. 153, both of Ireland's extant Travelling Post Offices and the last AEC railcar. Two carriages, GSWR No.'s 1097 and 1287, arrived at the railway in the mid-2000s on loan from RPSI, though ownership was later transferred to DCDR.

Wagons 
The DCDR also has a large selection of wagons, goods vans and underframes. Ex-NCC brake van No. 33 was the railway's first passenger-carrying vehicle. Included in the railway's wagon fleet is the most powerful steam crane in Ireland, NCC No. 3084. As the wagons do not contribute to bringing in revenue like engines and carriages, most are in storage except for a small few in use by the railway's Permanent Way or Locomotive Departments. In time, DCDR hopes to construct a dedicated goods shed in order to finally give its wagons a permanent home. In August 2022, a complete ballast train composed of three hoppers and a plough van were delivered to the railway from North Wall, Dublin across two days, supported by Iarnród Éireann.

A small fleet of permanent way vehicles, all acquired from NIR, and some road/rail on-track plant are used by the railway's Permanent Way department.

Stock Lists

Steam Locomotives

Diesel Locomotives & Railcars

Carriages

Wagons

Permanent Way Vehicles

Former DCDR Vehicles

Awards 

 National Railway Heritage Awards: Ian Allan Railway Heritage Award (First Class): Received in 1992 in recognition of Downpatrick Station Building.
 Northern Ireland Tourist Board and British Airways Tourism Awards (Highly commended): Received for 'Best Project', December 1999.
Heritage Railway Association Carriage and Wagon Award (Highly commended): Received in 1999 in recognition of GSWR carriage No. 836.
 Down District Council Tourism Heroes Award: Received in May 2008.
 Co-operation Ireland Pride Of Place Award: Received in November 2012.
 Heritage Railway Association Annual Small Groups Award: Received in 2014 in recognition of its involvement of young people and its excellent building and museum development.
Heritage Railway Association Carriage and Wagon Award: Received in 2019 in recognition of the restoration of BCDR railmotor No. 72.
Ulster Architectural Heritage Society Heritage Angel Awards (Highly commended): Received in October 2019 in recognition of the restoration of Bundoran Junction North signal cabin.
National Railway Heritage Awards: Abellio Signalling Award (Highly commended): Received in December 2019 in recognition of the restoration of Bundoran Junction North signal cabin.

Television and film appearances 

 Children in Need Quiet Man Spoof (BBC One NI, 2001)
 Puckoon (2002)
 Flight to Freedom (BBC One NI, 2005)
 Rain (2005)
 A Potted History of Armagh (BBC One NI, 2006)
 Raising Steam, a 40-minute documentary of which the DCDR was the subject (BBC One NI, 2008)
 Our Wee World (BBC One NI/Barking Films, 2010)
 Christopher and His Kind, starring Matt Smith (BBC2/Mammoth Screen, 2011)
Wodehouse in Exile, starring Tim Pigott-Smith and Paul Ritter (BBC 4, 2013)
 Walk the Line (Barra Best, BBC NI, 2014)
 The Lost City of Z, starring Robert Pattinson and Tom Holland (2015)
A Patch of Fog, starring Stephen Graham (2015)
 The Woman in White (BBC, 2017)
 The Last Letter (BBC NI, 2018)
 Mrs Wilson (BBC, 2018)
Agatha and the Truth of Murder (Channel 5, 2018)
Extreme Railways, starring Chris Tarrant (Channel 5, 2019)
Derry Girls (Channel 4, 2022)

See also

List of heritage railways in Northern Ireland
History of rail transport in Ireland
Sir John Macneil

References

Further reading

External links
Downpatrick & County Down Railway

Heritage railways in Northern Ireland
Transport in County Down
Downpatrick
Museums in County Down
Irish gauge railways